Hazel Grove is an electoral ward in the Metropolitan Borough of Stockport. It elects three Councillors to Stockport Metropolitan Borough Council using the first past the post electoral method, electing one Councillor every year without election on the fourth.

It covers the eastern part of Hazel Grove, including Norbury Moor and Torkington Park. Together with Bredbury & Woodley, Bredbury Green and Romiley, Marple North, Marple South and Offerton it constitutes the Hazel Grove Parliamentary constituency.

Councillors
Hazel Grove electoral ward is represented in Westminster by William Wragg MP for Hazel Grove.

The ward is represented on Stockport Council by three councillors: Paul Ankers (Lib Dem), Lou Ankers (Lib Dem), and Oliver Johnstone (Con)

 indicates seat up for re-election.  indicates seat won in by-election.

Elections in the 2020s

Elections in the 2010s

August 2019 (by-election)

The by-election occurred due to the resignation of the incumbent Liberal Democrats councillor Jon Twigge.

May 2019

May 2018

May 2016

May 2015

May 2014

May 2012

May 2011

May 2010

Elections in the 2000s

References

External links
Stockport Metropolitan Borough Council

Wards of the Metropolitan Borough of Stockport